Glenfield Mall is an enclosed shopping centre in the North Shore suburb of Glenfield, Auckland, New Zealand. It is situated between Glenfield Road to the west, Downing Street to the south and Bentley Avenue to the north. The centre features major retailers including Farmers, The Warehouse, Countdown, and Briscoes Homeware. The Glenfield Night Market was formerly held in the car park on Sunday evenings.

History
A food hall and fresh food stores were added in a 1991 refurbishment of the lower level. The mall was bought by Westfield Group in May 1996 and named Westfield Glenfield. A major renovation by Westfield in 2000 cost $100 million and enlarged the mall to 29,700 m2, with an increase from two levels to five levels.

In a 2008 rating of New Zealand shopping centres by a retail expert group, Westfield Glenfield received just two out of four stars, the lowest rating in the country (though not the lowest that would have been possible), based on the criteria of amount of shopping area, economic performance, amenity and appeal as well as future growth prospects. The reviewers considered that the centre was facing strong competition, including from its newer and larger sister centre Westfield Albany. The centre's management disagreed and noted that the centre remained a convenient family-focused destination.

On 30 November 2015, Scentre Group, the owner and manager of Westfield Shopping Centres, sold the mall to Ladstone Glenfield Limited, a subsidiary of Ladstone Holdings Limited. The mall was put up for sale again in September 2018.

See also
 List of shopping centres in New Zealand

References

External links
Glenfield Mall (official website)

Shopping centres in the Auckland Region
Shopping malls established in 1971
Glenfield
North Shore, New Zealand
1970s architecture in New Zealand